Gillian Sorensen is the former United Nations assistant secretary-general for external relations. Sorensen currently works with groups and organizations committed to peace, justice, development, refugees, and human rights. She recently addressed the National Model United Nations (NMUN) (March 2018), attended by students from over 130 countries.

Sorensen currently serves as a member of the board of the International Rescue Committee and as a member of the Council on Foreign Relations.

Personal life 

Sorensen grew up in Michigan, the daughter of parents who were active in politics and civic affairs.

She is a graduate of Smith College and studied at the Sorbonne. She has twice been an Institute of Politics Fellow at the John F. Kennedy School of Government at Harvard University.

Gillian Sorensen is the widow of Theodore C. Sorensen, who served as President John F. Kennedy's speechwriter and Special Counsel to the President in the White House.  They are the parents of a daughter, Juliet Sorensen.

Notes

References
NAFSA United Nations Foundation Advocate Gillian Sorensen to Headline Third Day of NAFSA Conference
"USC" USC Public Diplomacy Fall Speaker Series Public Diplomacy Fall Speaker Series: Gillian Sorensen

External links
UN Foundation Bio
Gillian Sorensen interviewed on Conversations from Penn State
Hear a Speaker-Global Exchange

People from Grand Rapids, Michigan
Smith College alumni
University of Paris alumni
Harvard Kennedy School people
University of Southern California faculty
Articles lacking sources from February 2008
Living people
American officials of the United Nations
Year of birth missing (living people)